Jogo do bicho ("animal game") is an illegal gambling game in Brazil, prohibited by federal law since 1946, but nevertheless very popular throughout the country. It is a lottery-type drawing, operated on a regional basis using the daily state lottery draw, by mobsters known as bicheiros or banqueiros ("bankers"). Despite its popularity, especially in Rio de Janeiro, it is illegal in 25 of the 26 states of Brazil plus the Federal District and those involved may be prosecuted. Paraíba is the only state where the game is legal and regulated by the state, even though federal law prohibits gambling. Unlike most state-operated lotteries, in jogo do bicho any amount can be wagered.

History

The originator of jogo do bicho was baron João Batista Viana Drummond, a Brazilian-born Englishman, to whom Emperor Dom Pedro II awarded a title and the concession to the Rio de Janeiro zoo in the late 19th century. As a publicity measure, Drummond encouraged visitors to guess the identity of an animal concealed behind a curtain, and paid prizes off to winners. In time the guessing game became a tremendously popular numbers game, with different numbers assigned to 25 animals.

Bets were soon being made by people outside the zoo. Within months, government authorities made its first attempt to shut down the game, but it simply shifted to the city, an environment in which it has thrived ever since. Rudyard Kipling, visiting Rio in the 1920s, wrote of seeing bookies wandering the streets carrying placards with colourful pictures of animals.

The game is said to have become popular because it accepted bets of any amount, in a time when most Brazilians struggled to survive a very deep economic crisis. "If you see two shacks lost somewhere in the backlands," a Brazilian diplomat once observed, "you can bet that a bicheiro lives in one of them and a steady bettor in the other."

For the following decades official policy fluctuated between tolerance of the game, sometimes motivated by corruption, and intermittent campaigns to crack down on gambling. In 1946, gambling was prohibited by federal law, but the game continued to thrive in illegality.

A crackdown on the game by São Paulo police in 1966 nearly paralysed the city. More than 60,000 men were idled. By that time it had grown into a US$500 million-a-year business that employed roughly 1% of Brazil's total working force. The crisis was quietly resolved in return for unspecified concessions.

Since the early 1990s, bicheiros have expanded their activities to bingo parlors, video poker and slot machines, known in Brazil as "nickel hunters" (caça-níqueis).

It was reported by the New York Times in 2007 that it was played everywhere in Brazil, and especially in Rio de Janeiro, from where the scheme was operated by about a dozen bosses, called bicheiros.

In Paraíba 

Paraíba is the only state where the game has been legalized at the state level, despite the federal law that prohibits it. The game is regulated by the State Lottery of Paraíba (LOTEP), which licenses banqueiros as lottery agents, to avoid the game's association with organized crime, as in Rio de Janeiro. The state capital, João Pessoa, has 15 authorized points. Each point pays a region-dependent monthly tax to LOTEP, depending on its business volume. The draw is made three times a day in the LOTEP building and released by the official state radio.

Criminal charges and political connections
Because it deals with large sums of sounding money, out of reach of government control, the game has attracted the attention of corrupt officials, who may ally with the bosses. Bosses are generally interested in buying the leniency of the government or the removal from office of people active on the game's repression.

To foster public support, the bosses have invested part of their enormous earnings in activities, like the financing of samba schools and football clubs. From the early 1970s until now, nearly all of the Rio de Janeiro samba schools are under the control of bicho bosses (bicheiros). Two soccer clubs famous for their association with such bosses were Bangu (with Castor de Andrade) and Botafogo (with Emil Pinheiro).

"The animal game is a deeply embedded cultural phenomenon with a certain romantic aura, and thus hard to eradicate," according to Denise Frossard, a former judge who became famous for sending 14 bicheiros to jail in 1993. "But it is also a quintessentially Brazilian way of laundering money and contributes greatly to the problem of impunity in this country." The bicheiros were arrested for criminal association and forming armed gangs. According to prosecutor Antônio Carlos Biscaia, the bicheiros built an association with the principal goal to corrupt authorities and cops and the elimination of 130 people. The superintendent of this association was Castor de Andrade. They were sentenced to six years each, the maximum sentence for racketeering. But in December 1996 they were all back on the streets, granted parole or clemency.

In March, 1994, police raided the stronghold of Castor de Andrade in Bangu. They seized 200 account books and 167 computer diskettes. Former president Fernando Collor de Mello, Rio governor Nilo Batista, São Paulo mayor Paulo Maluf, Rio mayor Cesar Maia, seven entrepreneurs, three judges, 12 congressmen and seven assemblymen, 25 police commissioners and 100 police officers were implicated.

Bicheiros Antonio Petrus Kalil, or Turcão, Anísio Abraão David, or Anísio, and Capitão Guimarães, at the time president of the Independent League of Samba Schools of Rio de Janeiro, were among 24 people arrested on April 12, 2007, for alleged involvement with illegal numbers games, bingo parlors and the distribution of slot machines. Raids by the Federal Police have uncovered big payoffs to judges, police officers, prosecutors and lawyers from the bosses who run the game. Mounds of documents have been seized and US$6 million in cash has been confiscated.

The possibility of legalisation has been often been argued, but no practical decision ever made.

Structure
Since its early inception the game has preserved a hierarchy: operators (banqueiros), managers (gerentes) and dealers (vendedores). This same hierarchy was later reproduced in the organisation of drug-trafficking and other types of organised crime in Brazil.

Bets are taken at pontos (points-of-sale) where dealers collect money and keep record of the bets. The bets (and the money) are sent to the central operator (banca), where the draw is done. All it takes is a scribbled note or a phone call to any of the thousands of bicheiros who haunt the street corners, shops and offices of every city, easily identified by their sunglasses, cigars and/or typical floral or printed shirts. Neither the pontos nor the bancas need a fixed operational centre. Most pontos are simple stools or wooden boxes on which the dealers sit through the day.

Drawings are usually held at 2 PM in local bicho headquarters, and the winning numbers are immediately dispatched by taxi and bicycle and scribbled in chalk on designated walls and lampposts. Phone lines become so clogged after each drawing that telephone company executives call it "the bicho hour."

The draw is not fair: if too many people bet on a given number, it is removed from the lot to prevent the quebra da banca (bankruptcy). This is necessary because most bancas operate with slim resources and their owners do not want to invest their personal assets to pay the bets.

Description

Animals
The name of the game arises from the mnemonic association of the drawn numbers with a random selection of 25 animals:

Superstition

Over the decades, superstitious theory has evolved around selecting the proper animal, much of it involving dreams. Horse, for example, can be indicated by a dream of a horse, or by dreams of wheat or milk or naked women. The elephant has come to be associated with death, and whenever there is a fatal traffic accident involving a car with one of the elephant's numbers (45-48) on its license plates, the betting is unusually heavy. When the Rio papers published the picture of a derailed locomotive in the 1960s, so many bet on the last four figures of its registration number that the bicheiros were forced to warn that they could not pay off at the usual odds if it won.

Bets and prizes
Each of the 25 animals is assigned a sequence of four consecutive numbers between 1 and 100. The most common way to play is to bet one real on an animal, but one can also choose a combination of numbers and numerals designated by an animal. The traditional four types of prizes are as follows:

 Cabeça ("head"): A bet on four numbers between 00 and 99, represented by an animal; returns 25:1.
 Dezena ("ten"): A bet on a number from 00 to 99; returns 100:1.
 Centena ("hundred"): A bet on a number from 000 to 999; returns 1000:1.
 Milhar ("thousand"): A bet on a number from 0000 to 9999; returns 10000:1.

If the last two numerals in the daily state lottery draw form one of the four numbers associated with an animal, a bicheiro will pay out 15 reais for a bet of 1 real.

Cultural impact
Despite its illegality, the game has left significant cultural influences in Brazilian society, even among people that have never played it.

 is responsible for the strong association of the number 24 with homosexuality in Brazil. In the game, 24 is the number given to the deer ( in Portuguese), an animal that has long been pejoratively associated with gay men (insulted as ).

The jersey number 24 is heavily avoided by male Brazilian athletes, with rare exceptions. Football players, for example, usually reject this number for their jerseys, and may express dissatisfaction when obligated to wear a 24 jersey due to fixed number rules in international competitions.
In 2022, only 4 teams in the  use the jersey 24: América-MG, Internacional de Porto Alegre, Santos FC and Sport Club Corinthians Paulista.
In the Copa América 2019, hosted by Brazil, its national team was the only one not displaying the number.
The taboo was broken during the 2022 FIFA World Cup, when Gleison Bremer wore number 24 in Brazil's match against Cameroon.
The new FIFA rules allowed up to 26 players numbered sequentially.

24 is also used in politics, as many LGBT candidates include 24 in their campaign numbers, to be easily associated with LGBT movement causes. For the same reason, the number is seldom used by heterosexual politicians, whether or not they have an anti-LGBT agenda. In the Brazilian Senate, for example, although there are 81 Senators, no one currently has a cabinet numbered 24, nor a car plate numbered SF-0024 (the Senators' plate options go from SF-0001 to SF-0095, and any available number can be freely chosen).

In 1964, before a football match between Portuguesa (RJ) and Vasco da Gama, the manager of Portuguesa, a much weaker team, was asked if he could defeat Vasco. Gentil Cardoso, the manager, commented that beating Vasco would be like drawing a zebra in Jogo do Bicho. As there is no zebra in the game, his sentence expressed an impossibility. However, Portuguesa did win that game (by 2-1), and since then the term  is used in Brazil for upsets.

Another football team with the rooster as its mascot is Clube Atlético Mineiro, whose supporters expected 2013 to be the "year of the rooster", also because the rooster is the 13th animal. Atlético Mineiro won their first Libertadores Cup in 2013, confirming the expectation for an important title in that year.

See also
 Bolita
 Numbers game

References

External links 
  Jornais de época
  lbr loterias
 loteriasbr
 Resultado do Jogo do Bicho

 
Brazilian culture
Lotteries in Brazil
Organized crime in Brazil